Sleep and Wake-Up Songs is the third EP by Okkervil River, released on November 2, 2004. This interim release was in anticipation of their subsequent full-length album, Black Sheep Boy.

Track listing

References

2004 EPs
Okkervil River albums
Jagjaguwar albums